James Wood Johnson (18561932) was an American businessman and one of the co-founders of Johnson & Johnson. In 1886, James Wood Johnson and his two brothers Robert Wood Johnson I and Edward Mead Johnson founded Johnson & Johnson in New Brunswick, New Jersey.

He died in September 1932 onboard RMS Majestic in mid-Atlantic while returning from holiday in Britain to the United States.

References

External links 

 People Who Made a Difference

1856 births
1932 deaths
19th-century American businesspeople
20th-century American businesspeople
American company founders
Businesspeople from New Jersey
Businesspeople in the pharmaceutical industry
Robert Wood Johnson family